The Consolidated O-17 Courier (company designation Model 2) was an observation and training aircraft used by the United States National Guard.

Development
A parallel development to the Consolidated PT-3 series, the XO-17 was a converted PT-3 with such refinements as improved fuselage streamlining, oleo shock absorbers, wheel brakes, balanced elevators and increased fuel capacity.

It was used almost exclusively as a cross-country flying, gunnery, photographic and radio trainer. The O-17 had a removable fairing (carrying a Scarff ring mounting for one .30 cal (7.62 mm) trainable Browning machine gun}.

The Royal Canadian Air Force purchased three generally similar aircraft, two Model 7 landplanes and one Model 8 floatplane, the latter with the same float gear as the NY series.

The sole XO-17A was converted from the PT-3 as a demonstrator that failed to secure any orders. It was later fitted with the experimental Packard DR-980 Diesel engine of 225 hp (168 kW).

The Model 15 was also an O-17 type airframe fitted with a Pratt & Whitney R-1340 engine. It too failed to win any contracts.

Variants
XO-17 (prototype)
Consolidated PT-3 Conversion with a 225 hp (168 kW) Wright R-790-1 engine, streamlined fuselage, modified undercarriage, increased fuel capacity, provision for dual controls and a dorsal 0.3 in (7.62 mm) gun, one conversion.
O-17 Model 2 Courier
Production version for United States National Guard use, 29 built.
XO-17A (prototype)
One Consolidated PT-3 converted with a Wright R-790-3 engine intended for export.
Model 7 (RCAF landplane)
Royal Canadian Air Force, two built.
Model 8 (RCAF floatplane)
Royal Canadian Air Force, one built.
XPT-8 (demonstrator)
The airframe of the XO-17A prototype fitted with a Packard DR-980 Diesel engine of 225 hp (168 kw), scrapped in 1932.
XPT-8A
A single PT-3A (29-115) similarly converted with a Packard DR-980 Diesel engine with Project Number 'P-564',  but returned to PT-3A configuration. The airframe was subsequently lost in a fatal midair with a P-12C of the 17th Pursuit Squadron 2 miles W of New Baltimore, Michigan on 17 December 1931.
Model 15 (demonstrator)
Conversion with a Pratt & Whitney R-1340 engine.

Operators

Royal Canadian Air Force

United States National Guard

 Eskisehir Air School

See also
Consolidated PT-1 Trusty
Consolidated PT-3
Consolidated PT-11

References

Consolidated O-17
O-17
Single-engined tractor aircraft
Biplanes
Aircraft first flown in 1927